Log is a rural locality (a selo) and the administrative center of Logovskoye Rural Settlement, Ilovlinsky District, Volgograd Oblast, Russia. The population was 3,748 as of 2010. There are 34 streets.

Geography 
Log is located 29 km north of Ilovlya (the district's administrative centre) by road. Ozerki is the nearest rural locality.

References 

Rural localities in Ilovlinsky District